Equestrian and Equestrian Endurance were contested at the 2006 Asian Games in Doha, Qatar. Equestrian was contested from 4 to 14 December.

In this sport, men and women compete side by side, against one another. There were three equestrian disciplines: dressage, eventing and jumping. Endurance events was contested on 14 December on Mesaieed Endurance Course.

Schedule

Medalists

Medal table

Participating nations
A total of 163 athletes from 22 nations competed in equestrian at the 2006 Asian Games:

References

External links
Equestrian Competition Schedule
 Equestrian Endurance Competition Schedule

 
2006
Equestrian
2006 in equestrian
Equestrian sports competitions in Qatar